Leif Hansen may refer to:

 Leif Hansen (businessman) (born 1957), founder and owner of a chain of auto body shops, Leif's Auto Collision Centers
 Leif Hansen (Norwegian boxer) (1928–2004), Norwegian boxer who competed in the 1952 Summer Olympics
 Leif Hansen (Danish boxer) (born 1934), Danish Olympic boxer
 Leif Hansen (footballer)